Christopher Morley Park is a public, Nassau County-owned park in Roslyn Heights, New York.

The park first opened in 1961. It is named for and dedicated after the late writer Christopher Morley, who lived a few blocks away in Roslyn Estates. It occupies  of land, and was once part of the Nettie Ryan Estate. The County of Nassau purchased the estate for roughly $700,000 (1961 USD).

The park contains
Dog Park
Playgrounds 
Walking Paths
Outdoor Swimming Pools
A 9 Hole Golf Course
3 Baseball/Softball Fields
Outdoor Ice Skating
4 Basketball Courts
2 Pickleball Courts
Paddlball Courts
Shuffle Board
Picnic Area
Fitness Trail

The Knothole 
Christopher Morley Park also is home to "The Knothole," Morley's writing studio. In 1961, a group of local residents wanted to save the Knothole and relocate it to city ground in Roslyn park or on a rented property. The Knothole was located on Mr. Morley’s past estate. In 1962, a proposal was approved by Nassau County Executive Eugene H. Nickerson to move the Knothole to a county park in North Hills. In 1966, the Knothole was transferred to the park, now called Christopher Morley Park. The renovated Knothole includes built-in bookshelves, a fireplace and a bunkbed. The Knothole's "dymaxion" bathroom, which was designed in 1936 by Morley's friend, Buckminster Fuller, the renowned scientist and inventor.

See also 

 Bay Park (Bay Park, New York) – Another major park owned and operated by Nassau County.
 Cantiague Park – Another major park owned and operated by Nassau County.
 Eisenhower Park – Another major park owned and operated by Nassau County.
 North Woodmere Park – Another major park owned and operated by Nassau County.
 Wantagh Park – Another major park owned and operated by Nassau County.

References 

North Hills, New York
Parks in Nassau County, New York